The Spice Girls, an English girl group, have released three studio albums, one compilation album, 11 singles and 18 music videos. Formed in 1994, the group was made up of singers Geri Halliwell ("Ginger Spice"), Emma Bunton ("Baby Spice"), Melanie Brown ("Scary Spice"), Melanie Chisholm ("Sporty Spice") and Victoria Beckham ("Posh Spice").

The Spice Girls' debut single, "Wannabe", was released by Virgin Records in the United Kingdom in July 1996. It went to number one in 37 countries worldwide and became the biggest-selling debut single of all time. In the UK it stayed at the top of the UK Singles Chart for seven weeks and went on to sell over six million copies worldwide. It subsequently topped the Billboard Hot 100 in the United States for four weeks in February 1997. Follow-up singles "Say You'll Be There" and "2 Become 1" also went to number one in the UK, and reached the top five across most of Europe and the US. "2 Become 1" was unofficially declared the band's "Christmas #1" in December 1996. The group's debut album, Spice, was released in the UK in November 1996 and became another global success, selling two million copies in its first week, and 10 million copies in the next seven months. Spice has sold 23 million copies worldwide and was certified ten times platinum by the British Phonographic Industry (BPI) in the UK. The fourth Spice Girls single, the double A-side "Mama"/"Who Do You Think You Are", also went to number one in the UK.

In November 1997 the group released their second album, Spiceworld, which has been certified five times platinum by the BPI. The album produced three number-one singles in the UK, "Spice Up Your Life", "Too Much" and "Viva Forever", with "Stop!" peaking at number two, ending the group's run of consecutive number-one singles in the UK. "Too Much" was noted as the Spice Girls' second Christmas #1 in the UK. In May 1998, Geri Halliwell left the group to pursue a solo career. She also cited personal differences between the band and herself. Geri expressed an interest in attending a breast cancer event, due to her own experience with a benign tumor removal years earlier; allegedly this was not possible with their European tour schedule, and ultimately she chose to leave. 

Now a four-piece, the Spice Girls released their third album, Forever, in November 2000; it peaked at number two in the UK Albums Chart and was certified platinum by the BPI. Forever also produced two more UK number-one singles, "Goodbye" and the double A-side "Holler"/"Let Love Lead the Way". "Goodbye" was initially released in December of 1999, becoming the group's third British Christmas #1. It was later included as a track on "Forever". In December 2000, the four remaining members decided to go on an indefinite hiatus and concentrate on solo projects and motherhood; all had solo UK top ten singles.

In June 2007 all five members of the Spice Girls reunited to tour. A Greatest Hits was released with two new tracks; the single, "Headlines (Friendship Never Ends)" and "Voodoo". The album peaked at number two in the UK, and became their first number-one album in Australia. It also peaked within the top ten in Ireland. Greatest Hits was also certified two times platinum in the UK. In 2012, the Official Charts Company revealed the biggest selling singles artists in British music chart history; the Spice Girls placed at 20th overall, making them the most successful girl group in UK chart history. They are currently the seventh overall biggest group of all time, with 8 million singles sold in the UK. The Spice Girls have sold more 100 million records worldwide

To mark the 25th anniversary of "Wannabe", an EP of the group's debut single was released in July 2021 that included previously unreleased demos.

Albums

Studio albums

Compilation albums

Box sets

Singles

As lead artist

As featured artist

Promotional singles

Songwriting and other appearances

Albums

Songs

Videography

Video albums

Music videos

Notes

References
General

Specific

External links
 
 
 

Discography
Discographies of British artists
Pop music group discographies